František Čermák and Michal Mertiňák were the defending champions, however they lost to Mahesh Bhupathi and Max Mirnyi in the quarterfinals.
British wildcard pair Andy and Jamie Murray won the title, defeating Bhupathi and Mirnyi 7–6(10–8), 5–7, [10–7] in the final.

Seeds

Draw

Draw

External links
 Doubles draw

Doubles